The Avenel Football Club is an Australian rules football club that was established in 1881 with evidence of a match against Seymour and many more games against other local towns up until the late 1890s when it first competed in the North East Football Association in 1898. In the early 20th century it first competed in the Waranga - North East Football Association. Avenel is located on the Hume Highway in Central Victoria, Australia, not far from Seymour, Victoria. The club is known as the 'Swans'. The Swans have won 16 senior premierships in their history. Between 1956 and 1976 Avenel merged with Longwood and were Avenel-Longwood Football Club.

The club currently competes in the Kyabram District Football League, where it has been one of the more successful clubs winning six premierships over the last thirty years, including back to back premierships in 1978 & 1979 and 1984 & 1985. The Kyabram and District Football League is a football league that covers an area similar to that of the Goulburn Valley and Picola & District Football Leagues, the league currently contains thirteen clubs.

Avenel shares a fierce rivalry with neighbours Nagambie. With the two clubs' Under 18 football sides playing for the Tabilk Cup each year. The Cup is donated by the Tabilk Junior Football Club, where the junior footballers under the age of 16 from both Avenel and Nagambie play jointly for the one club.

The Swans also share a rivalry, along with a piece of silverware with Violet Town; the Scott Kanters-Peter Ryan Cup, which the two clubs play for annually. The cup is awarded to the team that wins the game between the two sides each year. If the two clubs play each other twice during the home and away season, then the cup is contested when the team presently holding the cup hosts the other club.

The Avenel Football club fields three football sides in the Senior, Reserve and Under 18 divisions of the Kyabram and District Football League. The Club wear a predominantly white jumper with a red "V", like that of the old South Melbourne Football Club in the VFL.

The most notable footballer of recent times to have played for Avenel Football Club is former AFL footballer Barry Hall, who played 289 games with St Kilda, Western Bulldogs and Sydney Swans, having previously played in the club's 1994 Under 18 premiership.

Premierships
Senior Premierships
1898 (North Eastern Football Association)
1900 (North Eastern Football Association)
1901 (North Eastern Football Association)
1903 (North Eastern Football Association)
1905 (North Eastern Football Association)
1906 (North Eastern Football Association)
1910 (Waranga-North East Football Association)
1921 (Waranga-North East Football Association)
1932 (Waranga-North East Football Association)
1933 (Waranga-North East Football Association)
1978 (Kyabram District Football League)
1979 (Kyabram District Football League)
1984 (Kyabram District Football League)
1985 (Kyabram District Football League)
1989 (Kyabram District Football League)
1994 (Kyabram District Football League)
Reserve Premierships
1978 (Kyabram District Football League)
1979 (Kyabram District Football League)
1985 (Kyabram District Football League)
2002 (Kyabram District Football League)
Under 18 Premierships
1979 (Kyabram District Football League)
1983 (Kyabram District Football League)
1984 (Kyabram District Football League)
1994 (Kyabram District Football League)
2000 (Kyabram District Football League)
2005 (Kyabram District Football League)
2006 (Kyabram District Football League)

KDFL Best & Fairest Winners
1988 Rohan Aldous
1991 Peter Thorpe
2015 Don Stirling
2016 Kasey Duncan

KDFL Leading Goal Kickers
1984 William Hannam (83)
1994 Darren Brock (77)
2019 Kasey Duncan (58)

Avenel Football Club song
"See the Swans fly up, up, to win the premiership flag,
Our boys who play this grand old game,
Are always striving for glory and fame,
To see the Swans fly up, up, up,
The other teams they don't fear,
They all try their best,
But they can't get near,
As the Swans fly up!"

References

Kyabram & District Football League clubs
1913 establishments in Australia
Australian rules football clubs established in 1913